Mid Bedfordshire was, from 1974 to 2009, a local government district in Bedfordshire, England.

Creation
The district was formed on 1 April 1974 as part of a general reorganisation of local authorities in England and Wales carried out under the Local Government Act 1972. Mid Bedfordshire was formed by the amalgamation of five districts:
Ampthill Urban District
Biggleswade Urban District
Sandy Urban District
Ampthill Rural District
Biggleswade Rural District
The new council continued to use the former offices of Ampthill Rural District Council and Biggleswade Rural District Council until 2006, when a new combined office was built at Priory House, Chicksands for £15million.

Civil parishes

The district comprised the following civil parishes:

Ampthill
Aspley Heath
Arlesey
Astwick
Aspley Guise
Battlesden
Biggleswade (Town)
Blunham
Brogborough
Campton and Chicksands
Clifton
Clophill
Cranfield
Dunton
Edworth
Eversholt
Everton
Eyeworth
Flitton and Greenfield

Flitwick
Gravenhurst
Harlington
Haynes
Henlow
Henlow Camp
Houghton Conquest
Hulcote and Salford
Husborne Crawley
Langford
Lidlington
Marston Moretaine
Maulden
Milton Bryan
Meppershall
Moggerhanger
Millbrook
Northill
Old Warden

Potsgrove
Potton
Pulloxhill
Ridgmont
Sandy (Town)
Shefford (Town)
Shillington
Silsoe
Southill
Stondon
Stotfold
Sutton
Tempsford
Tingrith
Westoning
Woburn
Wrestlingworth and Cockayne Hatley

Elections and political control

The first election to Mid Bedfordshire District Council took place on 7 June 1973, with the 49 councillors elected forming a shadow authority until 1 April 1974. Following ward boundary changes, the number of councillors was increased to 53 in 1979. Elections for the whole council were then held in 1979 and every four years thereafter. In 2003 the wards were again redrawn, with the size of the council remaining at 53. The final election took place in 2007, with councillors staying in office until the abolition of the council in 2009.

The first council elected had a large majority of independent councillors. Gains by the Conservatives in 1976 meant that the council was under no control, although independents remained the largest group. In 1979 Conservatives gained a majority, which they held for sixteen years. In 1995 there was a large swing against the unpopular government of John Major, and the Labour Party gained 17 seats to achieve parity with the Conservatives. The council also included Liberal Democrats and Independents. In 1999 the Conservatives regained control, which they held until the council's abolition.

† New ward boundaries

Abolition
In 2006 the Department for Communities and Local Government considered reorganising Bedfordshire's administrative structure as part of the 2009 structural changes to local government in England. On 6 March 2008 it was announced that Mid Bedfordshire would merge with the neighbouring district of South Bedfordshire to form a new unitary authority called Central Bedfordshire. The new council was formed on 1 April 2009 although its initial members were not elected until 4 June 2009.

References 

Local government in Bedfordshire
Geography of Bedfordshire
Former non-metropolitan districts of Bedfordshire
English districts abolished in 2009
Central Bedfordshire District
1974 establishments in England

zh:貝德福德郡